Robert B. Stinnett (March 31, 1924 – November 6, 2018) was an American sailor, photographer and author. He earned ten battle stars and a Presidential Unit Citation. He was the author of Day of Deceit, regarding alleged U.S. government advance knowledge of the Japanese Attack on Pearl Harbor, plunging the United States into World War II.

Life
Stinnett participated in World War II from 1942 to 1946 as a naval photographer in the Pacific theater, serving in the same aerial photo group as George H. W. Bush. After the war he worked as a journalist and photographer for the Oakland Tribune.  He resigned from the Tribune in 1986 to research and write.

Stinnett was a research fellow at the Independent Institute in Oakland, California. He died on November 6, 2018, aged 94.

Day of Deceit 

In 1982 Stinnett read At Dawn We Slept, The Untold Story Of Pearl Harbor by World War II veteran and historian Professor Gordon Prange.  Stinnett went to Pearl Harbor to investigate and write a news story. His research continued for 17 years and culminated in Day of Deceit, which challenges the orthodox historiography on the attack on Pearl Harbor. Stinnett claimed to have found information showing that the attacking fleet was detected through radio and intelligence intercepts, but that the information was deliberately withheld from Admiral Kimmel, the commander of the base.

First released in December 1999, it received a nuanced review in The New York Times and is frequently referenced by proponents of advance knowledge theories. Many historians of the period reject its thesis, pointing to what they believe are several key errors and a reliance on doubtful sources.

The Play 
In 1982 Stinnett was working as a sports photographer for the Oakland Tribune. With 4 seconds left in the Big Game (football game) between Cal and Stanford, Stinnett stationed himself behind the south end zone in California Memorial Stadium, at Berkeley. As it happened, Kevin Moen and teammates Dwight Garner, Richard Rodgers, and Mariet Ford pulled off "The Play", in which Moen fielded the Stanford kickoff, lateraled the ball, and five laterals later, received the final lateral, which he ran into the end zone through the Stanford Band. Stinnett was in perfect position for a famous photographic shot wherein Moen is on the zenith point of his leap, roaring in triumph, the football held high over his helmet, and about to land on Stanford trombone player Gary Tyrell.

Bibliography
 George Bush: His World War II Years (Brassey's, 1992) 
 Day of Deceit: The Truth About FDR and Pearl Harbor (Simon and Schuster, 1999)

See also
 McCollum memo

References

External links
 Downloadable audio interview with Scott Horton
 Radio interview about Pearl Harbor
 Unwelcome Guests: "Fooling Most of the People Most of the Time"
 List of Stinnett presentations about Day of Deceit
 Rebuttal of Robert Stinnett's "Day of Deceit" with extensive, updated citations by Rear Admiral Richard E. Young, USN (Ret)

1924 births
2018 deaths
American non-fiction writers
United States Navy sailors
American conspiracy theorists
United States Navy personnel of World War II